The 159th Infantry Division "Veneto" was an infantry division of the Royal Italian Army during World War II. The Veneto was formed on 1 March 1942 and named for the Veneto region. The Veneto was classified as an occupation infantry division, which meant, that the division's artillery regiment consisted of two artillery groups instead of the three artillery groups of line infantry divisions and that the divisional mortar battalion was replaced by a divisional machine gun battalion. On 1 June 1943 the Veneto was disbanded and its units used to reform the 52nd Infantry Division "Torino".

History

World War I 
The division's lineage begins with the Brigade "Veneto" raised on 12 March 1917 with the 255th and 256th infantry regiments. The brigade fought on the Italian front in World War I and together with its regiments was disbanded after the war in September 1919.

World War II 
The 159th Infantry Division "Veneto" was activated in Udine on 1 March 1942 and consisted of the 255th and 256th infantry regiments, and the 159th Artillery Regiment. As a division raised during the war the Veneto did not have its own regimental depots and therefore its regiments were raised by the depots of the 13th Infantry Division "Re": the 255th Infantry Regiment "Veneto" was raised in Udine on 1 January 1942 by the 2nd Infantry Regiment "Re" and the 256th Infantry Regiment "Veneto" was raised in Tolmin on 1 January 1942 by the 1st Infantry Regiment "Re", while the 159th Artillery Regiment "Veneto" was raised by the 23rd Artillery Regiment "Re" in Udine.

Initially the Veneto was based in Udine with its units in Cividale del Friuli, Tarcento, and San Pietro al Natisone in the upper Venezia Giulia region along the Italy-Yugoslav border. In May–June 1942 the division moved to Gorizia with its units in the Vipava-Postojna area. There the division operated against Yugoslav partisans. The division continued its anti-partisan activities until April 1943, when it was recalled to Udine, where it was disbanded on 1 June 1943 and its units used to reform the 52nd Infantry Division "Torino", which had been destroyed during winter 1942/43 on the Eastern Front.

The 255th Infantry Regiment "Veneto" became the 81st Infantry Regiment "Torino", the 256th Infantry Regiment "Veneto" became the 82nd Infantry Regiment "Torino", and the 159th Artillery Regiment "Veneto" became the 52nd Artillery Regiment "Torino".

Organization 
  159th Infantry Division "Veneto"
 255th Infantry Regiment "Veneto"
 Command Company
 3x Fusilier battalions
 Anti-tank Company (47/32 anti-tank guns)
 Mortar Company (81mm Mod. 35 mortars)
 256th Infantry Regiment "Veneto"
 Command Company
 3x Fusilier battalions
 Support Weapons Company (65/17 infantry support guns)
 Mortar Company (81mm Mod. 35 mortars)
 159th Artillery Regiment "Veneto"
 Command Unit
 2x Artillery groups
 1x Anti-aircraft battery (20/65 Mod. 35 anti-aircraft guns)
 Ammunition and Supply Unit
 CLIX Machine Gun Battalion
 CLIX Mixed Engineer Battalion
 159th Engineer company
 259th Telegraph and Radio Operators Company
 159th Anti-tank Company (47/32 anti-tank guns)
 159th Medical Section
 2x Field hospitals
 1x Surgical unit
 159th Supply Section
 259th Bakers section
 144th Carabinieri Section
 145th Carabinieri Section
 159th Field Post Office

Commanding officers 
The division's commanding officers were:

 Generale di Divisione Luigi Krall (1 March 1942 - 1 June 1943)

References 

 

Infantry divisions of Italy in World War II
Military units and formations established in 1942
Military units and formations disestablished in 1943